Shaadi Ke Side Effects is a 2014 Indian Hindi-language romantic comedy film directed by Saket Chaudhary, and starring Farhan Akhtar and Vidya Balan. It is the sequel to the 2006 film Pyaar Ke Side Effects. The film is produced by Balaji Motion Pictures and Pritish Nandy Communications. The film is about a young couple who experience many comic events after their marriage. It was released on 28 February 2014.

Plot
Sid (Farhan Akhtar) and Trisha (Vidya Balan) are a happily married couple until Trisha gets pregnant and things start getting complicated. Sid is not ready for a baby as he is just a struggling music composer, yet lies to Trisha. On his friends' advice, Sid starts reading pregnancy books and following Trisha's daily routine by putting a balloon in his shirt. Finally, Trisha gives birth to a baby girl and starts devoting all her time to the baby. Trisha's mother (Rati Agnihotri) feels that Sid is a careless person and can not take this responsibility, at which Sid makes a desperate attempt to behave like a family man but fails, as on one occasion he takes his baby for a walk but forgets her in the market. Frustrated, Sid ask for help from Trisha's brother-in-law Ranveer (Ram Kapoor), who is a typical family man. Ranveer reveals to him that when he gets frustrated, he makes a business trip excuse and stays in a hotel room to enjoy his life as a bachelor. Sid takes on his idea and starts staying in a hotel, with the excuse of working overnight in studio. But soon he has to cut down his idea, due to an added expense at home as Trisha decides to hire an expensive governess (Ila Arun). Sid, then, without telling Trisha, goes for a cheaper solution by shifting to a shared PG along with Manav (Vir Das), a dope-head bachelor. Sid takes Manav's advice and starts living a carefree life.

Then enters Shekhar (Purab Kohli), a young neighbour, who saves the baby when she gets locked in and thus frequently comes to meet Trisha, which makes Sid jealous. Sid realises the value of his family when Manav is hospitalised and none of his family or friends are around to take care of him. Filled with guilt, Sid confesses the PG secret to Trisha, who in anger throws him out. Sid seeks Ranveer for advice, only to discover that Ranveer is having an affair. Ranveer confronts Sid by telling him that he has also cheated Trisha by devoting time apart from his family. Sid realises his mistake & after repeated apologies by Sid, Trisha reveals that she also got involved with Shekhar and is now pregnant. Sid rushes out of the house along with the baby and later he realises that he should forgive Trisha for their child and also because all these happened because of him and thus forgives Trisha. To which Trisha surprises him by telling that she is not pregnant with Shekhar's child but with their child. Sid and Trisha reunite and start living a happy family life along with their baby.

Towards the end Sid is in the park playing with their two children and giving "Fatherhood Notes" to other fathers in the park. He calls Trisha to give her the good news that a music company has finally asked him to compose a song for their album. Trisha is now a working woman and tells Sid that she will be late because of a deal which needs to be completed. Sid says that he is fine to look after the kids till she returns. As the camera pans out, it shows Trisha relaxing in a hotel room with a glass of wine.

Cast
 Farhan Akhtar as Siddharth "Sid" Roy, Trisha's husband
 Vidya Balan as Trisha Mallik Roy, Sid's wife
 Ram Kapoor as Ranveer Malhotra 
 Vir Das as Manav, Sid's friend 
 Gautami Kapoor as Aanchal Malhotra (Nee Mallik), Ranveer’s wife 
 Purab Kohli as Shekhar Parekh, Trisha’s neighbour 
 Nitesh Pandey as Madhok
 Ila Arun as Aunty (Hired Governess)
 Rati Agnihotri as Mrs. Mallik, Trisha's Mother
 Mukul Chadda (special appearance)
 Naveen Kaushik as Vikram 'Vicky'

Release
The trailer of the film was released on 28 October 2013. The film was released on 28 February 2014.

Critical reception
This movie bears resemblance to Hollywood movie She's Having a Baby.
In pre-release commentary, Biswadeep Ghos said that as a sequel, "One can visualise Farhan as Rahul's Sid, but Vidya as Mallika's Trisha is tough to imagine."
 
Indian Express' Shubhra Gupta said marriage takes two, and the tango here is only from Sid's perspective : how about showing us what it could be like from Trisha's ?. Sneha May Francis writes Saket's narrative slumps innumerable times over the two-hour-and-twenty-five-minutes screen time.
Madhureeta Mukherjee of The Times of India gave the film 3.5/5 and states that, "Single or married, this film will have more of a 'special effect' than 'side effect' on you."

Box office 
Box Office India stated the film started to an average to slow start, "Shaadi Ke Side Effects looks set to collect at premium multiplexes only as collections at even the good multiplexes outside metros the collections are very low,". Box Office India attributed the slow Friday sales to competition from the cricket match. In the second week, the box office collections dropped 85% from the first day collections. According to Box Office India, Friday had a collection of 57.0 million nett with Saturday showing a 40% increase. Collections dropped by 45% on Monday from its Friday release, collecting 28.5 million nett, for a four-day total of 235.0 million nett in India. Two week total bought Rs 360 million.

Overseas, the film went on to become third biggest grosser of 2014, collecting £131,463 in United Kingdom, $582,672 in United States and Canada, $500,000 in Gulf and $145,487 in Australia. Its first weekend total of $ is equivalent to  109 million nett.

Soundtrack 
T-Series acquired the music rights for Shaadi Ke Side Effects. The music director is Pritam and the lyricist is Amitabh Bhattacharya. Mikey McCleary is a guest composer for the track "Ahista Ahista". Mayur Puri wrote the lyrics for the song Vyah Karke Pachhtaya. Music recording engineer was Sukumar Dutta. The song Desi Romance was inspired by Yeh Jawaani Hai Deewani background music. Music producer is Sanjoy.

References

External links 

 

2014 films
2010s Hindi-language films
Indian romantic comedy films
Films featuring songs by Pritam
Films about Indian weddings
Films scored by Mikey McCleary
Indian pregnancy films
Indian sequel films
2014 romantic comedy films